Milecastle 60 (High Strand) was one of a series of Milecastles or small fortlets built at intervals of approximately one Roman mile along Hadrian's Wall.

Description
In 1851 an altar was ploughed up at this spot. The altar was dedicated to Cocidius, and was erected by the Sixth Legion.

Associated turrets
Each milecastle on Hadrian's Wall had two associated turret structures. These turrets were positioned approximately one-third and two-thirds of a Roman mile to the west of the Milecastle, and would probably have been manned by part of the milecastle's garrison. The turrets associated with Milecastle 60 are known as Turret 60A and Turret 60B. None of the turrets between Milecastles 59 and 72 were sought or identified prior to 1961, and the exact locations of turrets 60A and 60B have not been found.

References

60
Roman sites in Cumbria
Irthington